Hans Freiherr von Türckheim (May 27, 1853, Karlsruhe - February 7, 1920 also in Karlsruhe) was a German lawyer, naturalist and plant collector.

Having completed his studies of jurisprudence, Baron (Freiherr) Türckheim  left Germany in 1877 and spent the following 30 years as coffee farmer and German consul in Cobán, Guatemala. He made extended botanical explorations of that country and after returning to Germany in 1908, he was asked by Ignatz Urban to undertake a botanical exploration of the mountains of then Santo Domingo (now Hispaniola), which he did in the years 1909–10.
 
His Guatemalan collections were described by John Donnell Smith in his Enumeratio Plantarum Guatemalensium, and his Hispaniolan plants were treated in Urban's Symbolae Antillanae Vol. VIII 

The genus Tuerckheimia  (Arecaceae) as well as many plant species were named after him, for instance, Zamia tuerckheimii (a cycad from Guatemala), Tolumnia tuerckheimii (an orchid from Hispaniola) and Canna tuerckheimii.

External links
  Obituary (Allgemeine botanische Zeitschrift für Systematik, Floristik, Pflanzengeographie etc p. 33) 
 Biographical note by A. Knunker, Gartenflora 70:19-22. 1921 cited in  Botanical Abstracts 10:235,1922 on GoogleBooks

20th-century German botanists
1853 births
1920 deaths
Botanists active in the Caribbean
Botanists active in South America
19th-century German botanists